Craponius is a genus of minute seed weevils in the beetle family Curculionidae. There are at least three described species in Craponius.

Species
These three species belong to the genus Craponius:
 Craponius bigibbosus Hustache, 1916 c
 Craponius epilobii Seidlitz, 1891 c
 Craponius inaequalis (Say, 1831) i b (grape curculio)
Data sources: i = ITIS, c = Catalogue of Life, g = GBIF, b = Bugguide.net

References

Further reading

 
 
 

Curculionidae
Articles created by Qbugbot